Stephen of Hierapolis (fl. 600) was a bishop of Hierapolis Bambyce, Syria, and the author of a hagiography of St. Golindouch.

References

7th-century Syrian bishops
Hagiographers